Howard W. Peak (born 1948) is an American politician who served as the mayor of San Antonio, Texas from 1997 to 2001. He was succeeded in office by Ed Garza. Prior to serving as mayor of the city, Peak served as a member of the San Antonio City Council from 1993 to 1997.

Howard Peak was born in 1948, and graduated from Alamo Heights High School in 1967. Peak earned his Bachelor of Arts in History from University of Texas at Austin in 1974. In 1975, he earned his Master of Arts degree in Urban Studies and Environmental Management from the University of Texas at San Antonio. Prior to entering San Antonio politics, Peak worked as an urban planner.

During his tenure as mayor, Peak was responsible for the development of a system of greenway trails for the city, which were named in his honor after he left office. The office of Mayor of San Antonio is a non-partisan office, as of 2018.

Since leaving office, Peak has spent his time on volunteer efforts in the city of San Antonio, including a project to create multi-use hiking and biking paths along the greenway trails. Peak currently serves as chairman of the Linear Creek Advisory Board, and has received the State Trail Advocacy Award from the American Trails National Program.

Greenway 
The concept of building a looped-trail system within the city was originally created by Peak, and the system is named after him.

See also
 Timeline of San Antonio, 1990s-2000s

References

Living people
Mayors of San Antonio
Texas Republicans
1948 births
University of Texas at San Antonio alumni